Eraj Ravindra Fernando was the Mayor of Hambantota.

Eraj was educated at Nalanda College, Colombo.

In April 2014 a group of five United National Party politicians whilst visiting the Mattala Rajapaksa International Airport on a fact-finding tour, were allegedly attacked by local residents. In August 2019 Fernando was found guilty of threatening the politicians with a firearm and was sentenced to five years imprisonment. In October 2019 he was granted bail by the Hambantota High Court. Fernando is currently seeking a review of his conviction in the Court of Appeal.

References

 Mattala Airport Opens on March 18
 MPs who never sighted UNP polls campaign in H’tota meet their waterloo
 I never asked Eraj to go there-Namal
  Rise and fall of the ‘War-Victory’ situation

Sri Lankan Buddhists
Living people
Sri Lanka Freedom Party politicians
United People's Freedom Alliance politicians
Alumni of Nalanda College, Colombo
Sinhalese politicians
Year of birth missing (living people)